Burning Off Impurities is the third studio album by American experimental rock band Grails, released on Temporary Residence Limited in 2007.

Track listing
All songs written by Grails.

Personnel
Grails
Emil Amos – Drums, Guitar, Melodica
Alex Hall – Electric Guitar, Sampler
Zak Riles – Twelve String Guitar, Acoustic Guitar, Banjo, Oud, Electric Guitar, Pedal Steel Guitar
William Slater – Piano, Bass, Organ, Electric piano, Harpsichord, Guitar
Dylan Rice-Leary – Harmonica
Cory Gray – Trumpet, Baritone Horn

References

2007 albums
Grails (band) albums
Temporary Residence Limited albums